The 2008 West Virginia gubernatorial election took place on November 4, 2008. Incumbent Governor Joe Manchin III was the Democratic nominee, challenged by Republican nominee Russ Weeks and Mountain Party candidate Jesse Johnson. Manchin won every county in the state and was reelected by the largest margin for any gubernatorial candidate in West Virginia's history. Manchin won by over 44%, even as Barack Obama, the Democratic presidential nominee, lost the state to John McCain in the presidential election.

Party primaries

Democratic Party
Mel Kessler, State Delegate
Joe Manchin, incumbent Governor of West Virginia

Republican Party
Russ Weeks, former State Senator

General election

Predictions

Polling

Results

References

External links 
Elections from the West Virginia Secretary of State
West Virginia Governor candidates at Project Vote Smart
West Virginia Governor race from OurCampaigns.com
West Virginia Governor race from 2008 Race Tracker
Campaign contributions from Follow the Money
Official candidate websites (archived)
Joe Manchin, Incumbent Democratic nominee
Russ Weeks, Republican nominee
Jesse Johnson, Mountain Party  nominee

2008
West Virginia
Gubernatorial